Paul Read (born 25 September 1973) is an English retired professional footballer who made 100 league appearances in English football, as a striker, also playing in the United States and Sweden.

Career
Born in Harlow, Read began his career as an apprentice at Arsenal, but he never made a league appearance for the Gunners. While at Arsenal, Read spent loan spells at Leyton Orient and Southend United.
 He also spent time with the Albany Alleycats.

After leaving Arsenal in 1997, Read signed for Wycombe Wanderers, and made 59 league appearances. He left Wycombe in 1999, and spent a season in Sweden with Östersunds FK, before returning to England with Luton Town, where he made one Football League Trophy appearance. Read then signed for Exeter City, making 26 league appearances. He finished his career with Fleet Town.

References

1973 births
Living people
English footballers
Arsenal F.C. players
Leyton Orient F.C. players
Southend United F.C. players
Albany Alleycats players
Wycombe Wanderers F.C. players
Östersunds FK players
Luton Town F.C. players
Exeter City F.C. players
Fleet Town F.C. players
English Football League players
English expatriate footballers
English expatriates in the United States
Expatriate soccer players in the United States
English expatriate sportspeople in Sweden
Expatriate footballers in Sweden
Association football forwards